International Higher School of Medicine is a medical school in Kyrgyzstan established in October 2004. It has 3 main campuses, two of which are in Bishkek and the third is in Cholpon-Ata. Approximately 3,500 students of different nationalities study at IHSM.

References

Medical schools in Kyrgyzstan
Education in Bishkek